Challenge Anneka is a British entertainment reality programme that originally aired on BBC1 from 8 September 1989 to 15 October 1995 and was hosted by Anneka Rice.

It was announced in 2006 that the series was returning, but this time on ITV. The first of the two specials was shown on Boxing Day 2006. The second was transmitted 6 June 2007. On 23 May 2022, it was announced that the series would be revived again, this time on Channel 5 for a four-part series which will be transmitted 18 March-8 April 2023.

Format
The series was devised as a vehicle for Anneka Rice, who had previously appeared on Treasure Hunt, one of the first big hits for Channel 4. It was produced by Tom Gutteridge of Mentorn, who also produced the US version with Erin Brockovich.

The format of Challenge Anneka involved Rice being given a task to accomplish within a certain period, usually two or three days. She was supposed to have no knowledge of what the task of each particular episode would be before it began, and would have to organise its accomplishment by persuading companies and people to contribute their time and resources for free. The task would usually be in aid of a charitable cause, for example building a play area for children within the local community, or something similar.

The format was tested in 1987's Children in Need.

Rice would be based during the 'challenges' in a large blue truck, and for her frequent trips to persuade companies and people to take part she initially employed the use of a Volkswagen based beach buggy, and then went on to use a kit built Dakar 4x4 vehicle in the 1990s. For series 6 and 7, she had a dog called Pedro. Series 7 differed from the previous six series with new variation of theme tune, logo and format tweak involving small scale mini Challenges running alongside the main Challenge. She was also distinguished by her frequent use of her mobile phone to organise the projects, years before they became common everyday objects for people in Britain.

Another trademark aspect of the series would be the frequent on-screen presence of Rice's soundman, Dave Chapman, part of the camera team who followed her around as she attempted to accomplish the challenges and who often found himself having to lend a helping hand.

Most of the popularity of the series came from the tension of whether Rice and her teams of volunteers would accomplish their tasks before the deadlines set. Sometimes they would fail, but usually on such occasions those who had agreed to help out would carry on the following day to complete the work.

The format was sold to many European countries, each with a different host. In the late 90s, the show was produced by Mentorn in the United States as Challenge America (ABC), hosted by Erin Brockovich.

Get Well Soon: 500 Ways to Make You Feel Better
Get Well Soon: 500 Ways to Make You Feel Better is a BBC book published in 1995, the production of which was undertaken as part of the show. Proceeds from its sale were donated to the Women's Royal Voluntary Service. The book was written for people who are themselves, or have friends, in hospital. It included contributions from British celebrities including Susan Hampshire, Maureen Lipman, Jeffrey Archer, Ronnie Barker and Jo Brand.

ITV revival
Challenge Anneka returned in 2006 with a 'one-off' special on ITV, on Boxing Day and featured the team helping World Vision to rebuild a maternity clinic, a cricket pavilion and a children's play centre in Sri Lanka after the 2004 Tsunami disaster.

There were plans for two more UK specials in 2007 – Rice walked on stage, along with television crew, during a McFly concert in Cambridge, and asked the band if they would record a single for charity – this formed part of the Challenge Anneka challenge recording an album to raise money for Children's Hospices around the UK, broadcast on 6 June 2007 on ITV. The album, Over the Rainbow was released on 4 June 2007. The two specials gained 3.34m (26 December 2006) and 2.8m (6 June 2007) viewers on ITV. A third special, reported in the press at the time of the revived format, was never completed, as ITV dropped their plans to revive the series in a frequent format.
Following ITV abandoning their plans of a full revival, in 2009 Rice approached the BBC about a proposed revival as part of Children in Need night (where the format of Challenge Anneka had first been tested in 1987) to mark the 20th anniversary of the series. The BBC did not proceed with the proposal, citing that the series was no longer in the public consciousness.

Channel 5 revival 
On 23 May 2022, it was announced that the series would be revived again, this time on Channel 5 for a four-part series. This was shot September-November 2022.Anneka Rice and Dave The Soundman will return for the revival.

Episode 1 - "Foal Farm" 

Anneka begins at a dog rescue centre at Foal Farm in Kent with the building of a new block of kennels, a grooming parlour and a play area, all in time for its 60th anniversary.

Episode 2 - "Sprouts"

Debbie and Jo's food hub charity has outgrown its modest town centre location in Stockton-on-Tees, Co Durham, so Anneka sets out to transform a neighbourhood hall. Anneka's challenge is to help supersize their operation by transforming a run-down and creaking neighbourhood hall and its surrounding land around the corner into a new hub with its own cafe, teaching kitchen, food bank and storage facility for their equipment for community activities.

Transmissions

Regular

Specials

References

External links

1987 British television series debuts
1980s British game shows
1990s British game shows
2000s British game shows
2020s British game shows
1980s British reality television series
1990s British reality television series
2000s British reality television series
2020s British reality television series
BBC television game shows
British television series revived after cancellation
Channel 5 (British TV channel) original programming
ITV game shows
Television series by ITV Studios